This is a sublist of List of irregularly spelled English names.

These common suffixes have these regular pronunciations, yet would be counterintuitive (irregular) in normal English:
 -b(o)rough and -burgh – 
 -bury – 
 -cester – 
 -combe, -coombe, -comb and -cambe – . When stand-alone: always  (including in place names such as Castle Combe and Coombe Bissett)
 -ford – 
 -gh – silent (usually, as 'f' in a considerable minority of northern English place names and in Woughton, Milton Keynes)
 -ham – 
 -holm(e) – , 
 -mouth – 
 -on as first syllable is usually as in London, Coningsby or Tonbridge (see Middle English handwriting preventing 'un' and 'um'); excludes a few such as Lonsdale
 -wich - , 
 -wick – 

Prefixes:
 Al- ; with very few exceptions such as Alba, Alperton. 

List

Notes

References

Further reading
 

Irregularly spelled England
Irregularly spelled